A skerry is a small rocky island, usually defined to be too small for habitation.

Skerry, skerries, or The Skerries may also refer to:

Geography

Northern Ireland
Skerries, County Armagh, a townland in County Armagh
Skerry, County Antrim, a parish in County Antrim
The Skerries, Northern Ireland

Republic of Ireland
Skerries, Dublin, a seaside town in Fingal, County Dublin
Skerries railway station
Skerries, County Kildare, a townland in County Kildare

Russia
Minina Skerries
The area surrounding Taymyr Island
Sumsky Skerries

Scotland
Sule Skerry
Skerryvore
A number of locations in the Orkney Islands
Auskerry
Pentland Skerries
A number of locations in the Shetland Islands
Out Skerries
Gaut Skerries, in the Ramna Stacks
Ve Skerries

South Georgia
Skrap Skerries

United States
Skerry, New York

Wales
The Skerries, Isle of Anglesey

Australia
The Skerries (Victoria)

Literature and music
Skerry, a fictional mammal in Neal Stephenson's novel Cryptonomicon
"Skerries", isolated parts of The Dreaming (comics) in The Sandman
""From the Outermost Skerries", fourth symphony in C minor, Op. 39, by Hugo Alfvén

Other uses
Battle of Skerries, a 1316 battle in Skerries, County Kildare
Skerries RFC, a rugby team based in Skerries, Dublin
Skerry cruiser, aka square metre yachts, a type of sailing vessel
 Storm Over the Skerries, a 1938 Swedish film directed by Ivar Johansson